The 2007 North Devon District Council election took place on 3 May 2007 to elect members of North Devon District Council in Devon, England. The whole council was up for election and the Conservative party gained overall control of the council from the Liberal Democrats.

Election result
The results saw the Conservatives gain 12 seats to take control of the council from the Liberal Democrats with 22 councillors. These gains came at the expense of the Liberal Democrats who were down 5 to 17 seats and the independents who fell 7 to have 4 seats. Overall turnout in the election was 40.25%.

1 Conservative and 1 Liberal Democrat candidates were unopposed.

Ward results

By-elections

References

2007 English local elections
2007
2000s in Devon